WSOC-TV (channel 9) is a television station in Charlotte, North Carolina, United States, affiliated with ABC and Telemundo. It is owned by Cox Media Group alongside Kannapolis-licensed independent station WAXN-TV (channel 64). Both stations share studios on North Tryon and West 23rd streets north of uptown Charlotte, while WSOC-TV's transmitter is located near Reedy Creek Park in the Newell section of the city.

History
The station first signed on the air on April 28, 1957 as Charlotte's third television station, after WBTV (channel 3) and WAYS-TV (channel 36, which operated from 1954 to 1955); it was also Charlotte's second station on the VHF band. WSOC-TV is Charlotte's second-oldest continuously operating station, behind WBTV. It operated from a temporary facility on Plaza Road Extension in what was then a rural portion of eastern Mecklenburg County.

WSOC was originally locally owned by Carolina Broadcasting, operated by the Jones family, along with WSOC radio (1240 AM, now WYFQ on 930 AM) and WSOC-FM 103.7. WSOC was the second radio station to sign on in Charlotte, having made its debut in 1929, seven years after the debut of WBT (1110 AM). Channel 9 originally operated as a primary NBC affiliate (owing to WSOC radio's affiliation with the NBC Red Network), and maintained a secondary affiliation with ABC, sharing the network with WBTV. In 1959, WSOC-AM-FM-TV were sold to Cox Enterprises under its forerunner, Miami Valley Broadcasting Company. That same year, it dedicated its studios on North Tryon Street.

Channel 36 returned to the air in November 1964 as WCCB. WCCB moved to the stronger UHF channel 18 allocation in November 1966, but it continued to be at a competitive disadvantage because many Charlotte-area households did not yet have television sets with UHF tuning capability. As a result, ABC retained a secondary affiliation with WSOC and WBTV, while WCCB aired programs from all three networks (ABC, NBC and CBS) that WSOC and WBTV declined to air. In 1967, WSOC became an exclusive NBC affiliate, while WCCB became a full-time ABC affiliate.

By 1978, ABC had become the highest-rated broadcast television network in the United States for the first time; the network wanted a stronger affiliate in Charlotte than WCCB. WSOC switched its affiliation back to ABC on July 1, 1978, this time as a full-time affiliate. NBC programming was moved over to former independent station WRET (channel 36, now WCNC-TV), due to a promise by then-owner Ted Turner to make $2.5 million in upgrades to that station, including the planned launch of a news department and upgrades to its transmitter; WCCB became an independent station by default, remaining so for the next nine years until it affiliated with Fox when that network launched in October 1986. The WSOC radio stations were sold off in the early 1990s (the AM station that is now WYFQ is now owned by Bible Broadcasting Network; WSOC-FM is currently owned by Beasley Broadcast Group).

By the mid-1990s, WSOC-TV had a problem. It owned the rights to a large amount of syndicated programming, but increased local news commitments left it without enough time in its broadcast day to air it all. In 1996, it found a solution in the form of a joint sales agreement with independent station WKAY-TV (channel 64). As part of the deal, WKAY moved its operations to WSOC-TV's studios and changed its call letters to WAXN-TV. Under the JSA, much of channel 9's inventory of syndicated programming was acquired by WAXN. One of those programs was The Andy Griffith Show; it had been a mainstay on channel 9 for decades on weekday afternoons at 5 p.m. before being bumped in favor of a 5 p.m. newscast. Cox purchased WAXN outright for $3 million in 1999, shortly after the Federal Communications Commission (FCC) reversed its long-standing ban on television station duopolies; the sale was officially approved by the FCC in 2000. WSOC-TV served as the Charlotte "Love Network" affiliate of the Jerry Lewis MDA Labor Day Telethon from 1974 to 2001; the program moved to WAXN thereafter, before returning to WSOC in 2013 (by this point, known as the MDA Show of Strength) after the program abandoned its syndicated long-form telethon format and became a shortened two-hour network telecast on ABC; the telecast was discontinued after 2014.

On December 21, 2010, a distraught 51-year-old woman armed with a gun entered the WSOC-TV studios, forcing the station to temporarily go off the air just after the start of that evening's 5 p.m. newscast. After a one-hour standoff, the woman was taken into custody; it was later determined that the gun was not loaded. No injuries were reported in the incident.

In February 2019, it was announced that Apollo Global Management would acquire Cox Media Group and Northwest Broadcasting's stations. Although the group planned to operate under the name Terrier Media, it was later announced in June 2019 that Apollo would also acquire Cox's radio and advertising businesses, and retain the Cox Media Group name. The sale was completed on December 17, 2019.

News operation

WSOC-TV presently broadcasts 37½ hours of locally produced newscasts each week (with 5½ hours each weekday and five hours each on Saturdays and Sundays); in addition, the station produces an additional 17 hours of newscasts each week for sister station WAXN-TV (in the form of a two-hour extension of WSOC's weekday morning newscast and an hour-long 10 p.m. newscast).

Since the early 1970s, WSOC-TV has used the Eyewitness News brand for its newscasts. However, its overall news presentation is very similar to the Action News format at Atlanta sister station WSB-TV. When channel 9 expanded its 6 p.m. newscast to a full hour, it began airing ABC World News Tonight at 7 p.m. This ended in 1993, when the addition of a newscast at 5:30 p.m. led the station to cut back the 6 p.m. newscast to a half hour and World News Tonight moved back to 6:30.

For most of its first quarter-century on the air, WSOC's newscasts placed a very distant second in the Charlotte market, behind the longer-established WBTV. However, in 1981, the station scored a major coup when longtime WBTV anchorman Doug Mayes moved to WSOC as its noon anchor, where he stayed until his retirement in 1992. Mayes said years later that WSOC made an offer too generous for him to turn down, considering that he had two kids in college at the time.  The move quickly paid off; in 1982, it overtook WBTV for the lead at 11 p.m., a lead it held for almost 25 years. It surpassed WBTV in most other timeslots beginning in 1990, but lost the lead in the noon time period to WBTV in 1994.

Channel 9's two-decade dominance of the early evening news timeslots largely stemmed from the former presence of Oprah as a lead-in to the 5:00 p.m. newscast; the syndicated talk show aired on channel 9 throughout its national run from 1986 to 2011. During the February 2011 ratings period, the station's newscasts won in every time slot except noon and 11 p.m., which were won by WBTV.  WSOC-TV lost the lead at noon as well in the February 2013 sweeps period.

By the February 2016 sweeps, however, the departure of a number of key reporters in 2015 resulted in WSOC-TV falling to second place in all timeslots. However, it maintained its historic dominance east of the Catawba River.

Since 2000, WSOC-TV has produced a 10 p.m. newscast for sister station WAXN-TV. The program originated on then-Fox affiliate WCCB through a news share agreement established with that station in 1999, until the summer of 1999, when WCNC took over production of the primetime newscast shortly before WCCB launched its own news department in January 2000. During the February 2011 ratings period, WSOC's 10 p.m. newscast on WAXN placed second behind WCCB's in-house newscast; it also placed ahead of the WBTV-produced newscast on then-CW affiliate WJZY (channel 46, now a Fox affiliate), as well as the 11 p.m. newscast on WCNC. Bill Walker served as WSOC's main anchor from 1971 until his retirement in 2005, the longest tenure of any news anchor in Charlotte television history.

On April 22, 2007, WSOC-TV became the first television station in the Charlotte market and the second station in North Carolina overall (after Raleigh CBS affiliate WRAL-TV) to begin broadcasting its local newscasts in high definition (WSOC was also the fourth Cox-owned station to upgrade its newscasts to HD, following WSB-TV and Orlando's WFTV); the WAXN broadcasts were not included in the upgrade until October 2008. In September 2010, WSOC began producing a two-hour extension of its morning newscast for WAXN, airing from 7:00–9:00 a.m. (which competes with WSOC's broadcast of Good Morning America).

On August 26, 2012, starting with its 6 p.m. newscast, WSOC-TV debuted a brand new news set and graphics package as well as an updated version of the station's "Circle 9" logo, which has been in use since 1984 (and is similar in resemblance to the "9" logo long used by KUSA in Denver and formerly by KWTV-DT in Oklahoma City). On December 2, 2013, WSOC expanded the WAXN 10:00 p.m. newscast to one hour, citing the growing audience for the program (which had been placing at #1, among the primetime newscast in the Charlotte market; ahead of WCCB's late evening newscast and a WBTV-produced program on WJZY, which has since been replaced with its own in-house newscast) as the reason for the expansion.

Notable former on-air staff
 Peter Daut – anchor/reporter (2012–2014); now at KESQ-TV
 Doreen Gentzler – anchor/reporter (1979–1983); later at WRC-TV until her retirement in 2022
 Chuck Goudie – news reporter/sports anchor (1977–1980); now at WLS-TV 
 Harold Johnson – sports director (1979–2006); retired; later became 2010 Republican candidate for U.S. House of Representatives, 8th District of North Carolina
 Michelle Kosinski – reporter; now at CNN 
 Bob Lamey – sportscaster, former Indianapolis Colts radio play-by-play broadcaster; now retired
 Diana Williams – reporter (1979–1982); later at WABC-TV; now retired

Technical information

Subchannels
The station's digital signal is multiplexed:

On March 9, 2017, WSOC-TV announced that it would launch Telemundo Charlotte, on subchannel 9.2, which launched on June 1 of that year. Laff, which was on subchannel 9.2 since April 15, 2015, relocated to WAXN-DT4. WSOC-DT2 effectively took over the channel positions on pay-TV providers in the Charlotte market upon that day for Telemundo's national feed. WSOC-DT2 also features a secondary Spanish-language local news operation which draws from both the resources of WSOC and its own reporting. It is the first full-power over-the-air Spanish-language station in Charlotte. On May 2, 2022, GetTV switched channels from WAXN-TV to WSOC-TV subchannel 9.3.

Analog to digital conversion
WSOC-TV shut down its analog signal, over VHF channel 9, on June 12, 2009, the official date in which full-power television stations in the United States transitioned from analog to digital broadcasts under federal mandate. The station's digital signal remained on its pre-transition UHF channel 34, until it moved to channel 19 as part of the digital repack in 2019. With the switch to digital, viewers in several parts of Charlotte itself needed an attic-mounted or roof-mounted antenna to get a clear picture from the station. Through the use of PSIP, digital television receivers display the station's virtual channel as its former VHF analog channel 9.

NextGen TV
WSOC-TV upgraded to NextGen TV on June 29, 2021.

Translators
Although WSOC-TV's digital transmitter operates at a full million watts, several portions of the market lost coverage when the station switched to digital. The station operates three digital translators to improve coverage in these areas: W26FA-D in Valdese signed on the air on May 28, 2009 (simulcasting WSOC on digital channel 6.1 and a widescreen standard definition feed of WAXN on digital subchannel 6.2), in order to serve the Unifour region of the state. WSOCTV1 is a displacement translator on VHF channel 12 (virtual channel 9.5), which transmits from Crowders Mountain to serve Shelby, it signed on the air on January 15, 2010. WSOCTV2, Statesville went on the air on June 23, 2012 at 5:58 p.m., broadcasting on VHF channel 12 (virtual channel 9.9). WSOC previously operated a displacement translator for WAXN-TV in China Grove, on WAXNTV1 (UHF channel 30), which also carried a widescreen standard definition feed of WSOC-TV on virtual channel 9.7, until it was shut down on October 15, 2012.

W26FA-D Marion

WSOC-CR Shelby

WSOC-ST Statesville

Out-of-market cable and DirecTV carriage
In recent years, WSOC has been carried on cable in several areas outside of the Charlotte television market, including on cable systems within the Greensboro–Winston-Salem–High Point market in North Carolina, the Greenville and Florence–Myrtle Beach markets in South Carolina, and the Tri-Cities market in Tennessee and Virginia. On DirecTV, WSOC has been carried in several counties that are part of the Greensboro–Winston-Salem–High Point market.

References

External links

SOC-TV
ABC network affiliates
Telemundo network affiliates
Cox Media Group
Television channels and stations established in 1957
1957 establishments in North Carolina